The 2014 Melanesian Super Cup was the inaugural edition of the Melanesian Super Cup. The matches were played at the Port Vila Municipal Stadium in Port Vila, with tournament was played in round-robin format.

Teams 
The 3 teams participating in the cup are:
 Amicale
 Solomon Warriors
 Tafea

Matches

All times UTC+14.

References

International association football competitions hosted by Vanuatu
2013–14 in OFC football
2013–14 in Vanuatuan football